The Midway Gardens Orchestra was a jazz group active in the Chicago area of the United States during 1923. The band was led by Elmer Schoebel and played at Chicago's Midway Gardens. The group recorded under various names, and as a result their recordings are difficult to find.

Discography
Selected recordings include: 

As the Original Memphis Melody Boys: There's No Gal Like My Gal, 1923, Gennett
As the Original Memphis Melody Boys: Blue Grass , Gennett
As the Chicago Blues Dance Orchestra: House of David Blues'', 1923, Columbia Records Columbia

References

Big bands
Musical groups established in 1923